Rugāji is a village in Rugāji Parish, Balvi Municipality in the Latgale region of Latvia.

Towns and villages in Latvia
Balvi Municipality
Latgale